Bothamley is a surname. Notable people with the surname include:

 Grafton Bothamley (1880–1956), Clerk of the New Zealand House of Representatives
 Hilton Bothamley (died 1919), Archdeacon of Bath, England

See also
 Bottomley